Justin Anthony Keenan (born May 2, 1989) is an American professional basketball player for Gunma Crane Thunders in Japan. He plays at the power forward and center positions.

College career
Keenan played college basketball for the NCAA Division II Ferris State Bulldogs. He was named the D2 National Player of the Year for the 2010–11 season.

College statistics

|-
| style="text-align:left;"| 2007–08
| style="text-align:left;"| Ferris State
| 29 || 27 ||  ||.539  ||  || .778|| 6.9 ||  ||  || || 15.9
|-
| style="text-align:left;"| 2008–09
| style="text-align:left;"| Ferris State
| 26 || 25 || 30.8 || .546 || .200 || .759|| 7.3 ||1.1  || 1.2 || 0.5 || 20.2
|-
| style="text-align:left;"| 2009–10
| style="text-align:left;"| Ferris State
| 29 || 29 || 30.8 || .551 || .100 || .689|| 6.9 ||1.1  || 1.2 || 0.4 || 20.1
|-
| style="text-align:left;"| 2010–11
| style="text-align:left;"| Ferris State
| 32 ||32 || 33.0 || .553 || .500 || .685|| 9.7 ||1.3  || 0.8 || 0.3 || 21.6
|-

Professional career
During his pro club career, Keenan has been a standout player in various basketball leagues in both Central America and South America.

Keenan signed with Gunma Crane Thunders on June 29, 2020.

Career statistics

Regular season 

|-
| align="left" | 2011–12
| align="left" | Institución Atlética Larre Borges
|29  || || 36.9 ||.570  ||.375 || .790 || 11.2 ||  || || || bgcolor="CFECEC"| 23.0*
|-

| align="left" | 2011–12
| align="left" | Panteras de Miranda
| 2 || 2 || 29.0 ||.444  || .000 || .833 || 6.00 ||1.00  ||1.50 ||0.00 || 10.50
|-
| align="left" | 2012–13
| align="left" | Club Trouville
|38  || ||30.9  ||.540  ||.350 ||  || 9.2 ||1.7  ||1.3 || || bgcolor="CFECEC"|26.3*
|-
| align="left" | 2012–13
| align="left" | Capitanes de Arecibo
| 4 || 1 || 24.2 ||.556  || .000 || .647 || 8.00 ||0.00  ||0.50 ||0.75 || 12.75
|-
| align="left" | 2012–13
| align="left" | Caciques de Humacao
| 3 || 3 || 22.0 ||.450  || .000 || .579 || 9.00||1.00  ||1.33 ||0.33 || 9.67
|-
| align="left" | 2013–14
| align="left" | La Union de Formosa
| 44 || 44 || 32.3 ||.521  || .481 || .766 || 8.50 ||0.95  ||0.68 ||0.14 || 20.05
|-
| align="left" | 2013–14
| align="left" | Maratonistas de Coamo
| 29 || 29 || 35.1 ||.488  || .260 || .773 || 7.83||1.66  ||0.83 ||0.24 ||bgcolor="CFECEC"| 22.17*
|-
| align="left" | 2014–15
| align="left" | Pioneros de Quintana Roo-Cancun
| 53 || 53 || 25.3 ||.624  || .378 || .734 || 6.64||1.09  ||0.55 ||0.17 || 18.00
|-
| align="left" | 2014–15
| align="left" | Maratonistas de Coamo
| 24 || 14 || 25.8 ||.536  || .240 || .796 || 6.21||1.04  ||0.79 ||0.25 || 15.96
|-
| align="left" | 2015
| align="left" | Pioneros de Quintana Roo-Cancun
| 8 || 8 || 28.5 ||.602  || .364 || .711 || 7.00||1.25  ||0.75 ||0.12 || bgcolor="CFECEC"|19.25*
|-
|  align="left"  style="background-color:#afe6ba; border: 1px solid gray" | 2015–16†
| align="left" | Pioneros de Quintana Roo-Cancun
| 52 || 42 || 20.1 ||.594  || .344 || .791 || 5.10||1.19  ||0.90 ||0.10 || 13.10
|-
| align="left" | 2015–16
| align="left" | Indios de Mayagüez
| 11 || 9 || 20.8 ||.492  || .500 || .818 || 3.82||0.55  ||0.45 ||0.09 || 8.36
|-
| align="left" | 2016–17
| align="left" | Soles de Mexicali
| 50 || 50 || 31.5 ||.587  || .408 || .794 || 7.74||1.94  ||1.10 ||0.24 ||bgcolor="CFECEC"|  24.10*
|-
| align="left" | 2016–17
| align="left" | Atléticos de San Germán
| 41 || 39 || 28.2 ||.489  || .333 || .778 || 5.37||2.37  ||0.66 ||0.29 || 15.12
|-
| align="left" | 2017
| align="left" | Soles de Mexicali
| 6 || 6 || 31.4 ||.513  || .400 || .844 || 8.00||2.33  ||0.50 ||0.00 || 21.00
|-
| align="left" | 2017–18
| align="left" | Club San Martín de Corrientes
| 55 || 3 || 22.2 ||.502  || .321 || .768 || 4.65||0.65  ||0.71 ||0.11 || 15.96
|-
| align="left" | 2017–18
| align="left" | Santeros de Aguada
| 12 || 12 || 26.8 ||.576  || .471 || .844 || 5.25||1.58  ||0.83 ||0.08 || 17.17
|-
| align="left" | 2017
| align="left" | Club San Martín de Corrientes
| 3 || 1 || 20.3 ||.524  || .000 || .667 || 4.33||0.33  ||0.33 ||0.00 || 11.33
|-
| align="left" | 2018–19
| align="left" | Akita Happinets
|53  ||52  || 30.2 || .499 || .396 || .785 || 8.7 ||1.5  || 1.3 || 0.1 ||22.8
|-
| align="left" | 2019–20
| align="left" | Akita Happinets
|26  ||26  || 28.5 || .482 || .348 || .815 || 6.8 ||2.2  || 1.9 || 0.2 ||21.1
|-
| align="left" | 2020-21
| align="left" | Gunma Crane Thunders
|51  ||2  || 22.5 || .546 || .338 || .766 || 6.2 ||2.4  || 0.6 || 0.1 ||17.2
|-
| align="left" | 2021-22
| align="left" | Gunma Crane Thunders
|45  ||40  || 25.8 || .472 || .421 || .754 || 6.0 ||3.5  || 1.2 || 0.1 ||14.9
|-
|}

Playoff games 

|-
| align="left" | 2016-17
| align="left" | San German
|7  || ||28.7 ||.567  ||.412 || .636 ||5.4 ||2.4  ||1.0 || 0.3|| 14.9
|-
| align="left" | 2017-18
| align="left" | San Martin Corrientes
|18  || ||19.8 ||.394  ||.233 || .764 ||4.4 ||0.8  ||0.6 || 0.1|| 8.8
|-
|}

Early cup games 

|-
|style="text-align:left;"|2018
|style="text-align:left;"|Akita
|2 || 1 || 25:27 || .548 || .111 || .857 || 10.0 || 2.0 || 2.0 || 0.5 || 29.5
|-
|style="text-align:left;"|2019
|style="text-align:left;"|Akita
|2 || 2 || 24:35 || .519 || .167 || .786 || 10.0 || 2.0 || 2.0 || 0.0 || 20.0
|-

Preseason games

|-
| align="left" |2018
| align="left" | Akita
| 2 || 1 || 19.2 || .500 ||.333  || .684||3.5 || 1.0|| 0.5 || 0.0 ||  16.5
|-
| align="left" |2019
| align="left" | Akita
| 3 || 2 || 17.3 || .579 ||.286  || .889||2.7 || 1.0|| 1.0 || 0.3 ||  10.7
|-

Source: Changwon1Changwon2
Source: UtsunomiyaToyamaSendai

Personal life
Keenan is the son of Vernon Keenan Jr. and Zsa Zsa Keenan. He has his right arm tattooed with the Chinese letters 强者生存 ("The Strong Survive"). He suffered from Wolff–Parkinson–White syndrome in 2012.

References

External links
RealGM Stats
Latinbasket.com Profile
Ferris State College Bio

1988 births
Living people
Akita Northern Happinets players
American expatriate basketball people in Argentina
American expatriate basketball people in Japan
American expatriate basketball people in Mexico
American expatriate basketball people in Uruguay
American expatriate basketball people in Venezuela
American men's basketball players
Atléticos de San Germán players
Baloncesto Superior Nacional players
Basketball players from Grand Rapids, Michigan
Caciques de Humacao players
Capitanes de Arecibo players
Centers (basketball)
Club San Martín de Corrientes basketball players
Ferris State Bulldogs men's basketball players
Indios de Mayagüez basketball players
La Unión basketball players
Maratonistas de Coamo players
Panteras de Miranda players
Pioneros de Quintana Roo players
Power forwards (basketball)
Santeros de Aguada basketball players
Soles de Mexicali players